The Brisbane Lions' 2007 season was its 11th season in the Australian Football League (AFL).

Season summary

Premiership Season

Home and away season

Round 1

Round 2

Round 3

Round 4

Round 5

Round 6

Round 7

Round 8

Ladder

Gallery

References

Brisbane Lions Season, 2007
Brisbane Lions seasons